"Darkness" is the second single released from the album The Tension and the Spark, released by Australian singer Darren Hayes in 2004. It charted at #40 in the Australian Singles Chart.

Track listings
 Australia CD1
 "Darkness" (radio edit) – 3:53
 "Random Blinking Light" – 4:17
 "Pop!ular" (video)
 "Darkness" (video)

 Australia CD2 – The Remixes
 "Darkness" (album version) – 5:17
 "Darkness" ('dp Behind the Darkness Remix) – 6:00
 "Darkness" (Roc & Soul Club Mix) – 7:30
 "Darkness" (Mark Dynamix & Jaytech's Deep Glow Mix) – 8:11
 "Darkness" (Mark Dynamix & Jaytech's Ambient Glow Mix) – 4:34

 UK CD1
 "Darkness" (radio edit) – 3:53
 "Touch" – 4:55

 UK CD2
 "Darkness" (radio edit) – 3:53
 "Random Blinking Light" – 4:17
 "Darkness" ('dp Behind the Darkness Remix) – 6:00
 "Darkness" (video)

Charts

External links
Darren Hayes – "Darkness" music video

2004 singles
Darren Hayes songs
Songs written by Robert Conley (music producer)
Songs written by Darren Hayes
2004 songs
Columbia Records singles